Cafe Society is a 1939 American romantic comedy film directed by Edward H. Griffith and starring Madeleine Carroll, Fred MacMurray and Shirley Ross. A wealthy young woman marries a reporter to win a bet.

Plot
The wealthy Christopher "Chris" West is a member of the cafe society.  To win a bet, she marries reporter Crick O'Bannon, who believes Chris married him for love.  When Crick overhears Chris telling one of her friends about the bet, he decides to get even by writing a story about her betrayal.  In response, Chris's grandfather, Christopher West Sr, apologizes for his granddaughter's behavior and requests that the couple live together until the divorce is quietly finalized in order to avoid a scandal.  Because he dislikes Chris' society friends, Crick refuses and lives apart from her.

While still married, Chris and Crick constantly argue.  When she notices that Crick is close to nightclub singer Bells Browne, Chris becomes jealous but resigned that Crick prefers Bells.  She decides to sail for Europe, but is surprised when Crick appears on the ship, having been alerted to Chris's departure by her grandfather.  Crick explains that Bells is only a friend and Chris returns to shore with him.  However, Chris's jealousy resurfaces upon seeing Bells singing at the club that night and she persuades the club's owner to fire Bells.  When the bartender, Bill, calls Chris out on her brash behavior, a contrite Chris asks that Bells be rehired and admits to Crick that she has been an awful fool.

Cast
 Madeleine Carroll as Christopher West  
 Fred MacMurray as Crick O'Bannon  
 Shirley Ross as Bells Browne  
 Jessie Ralph as Mrs. De Witt  
 Claude Gillingwater as Old Christopher West  
 Allyn Joslyn as Sonny De Witt  
 Paul Hurst as Bartender
 Lillian Yarbo as Mattie Harriett (uncredited)

References

Bibliography
 Stephens, Michael L. Art Directors in Cinema: A Worldwide Biographical Dictionary. McFarland, 1998.

External links
 

1939 films
1939 romantic comedy films
1930s English-language films
American romantic comedy films
Films directed by Edward H. Griffith
Paramount Pictures films
American black-and-white films
1930s American films